The 2000–01 Red Stripe Bowl was the 27th season of what is now the Regional Super50, the domestic limited-overs cricket competition for the countries of the West Indies Cricket Board (WICB). It ran from 11 to 22 October 2000.

Ten teams contested the competition – the six regular teams of West Indian domestic cricket (Barbados, Guyana, Jamaica, the Leeward Islands, Trinidad and Tobago, and the Windward Islands), plus four invited international teams from the ICC Americas region (Bermuda, Canada, the Cayman Islands, and the United States). The Cayman Islands team were making their debut in List A cricket. The semi-finals and final of the competition were all held in Jamaica, at Kingston's Sabina Park. The Windward Islands defeated the Leewards in the final to win only their second domestic one-day title. Two players from the Windwards, Junior Murray and Nixon McLean, led the tournament in runs and wickets, respectively, with Murray being named the player of the tournament.

Squads

Group stage

Zone A

Zone B

Finals

Semi-finals

Final

Statistics

Most runs
The top five run scorers (total runs) are included in this table.

Source: CricketArchive

Most wickets

The top five wicket takers are listed in this table, listed by wickets taken and then by bowling average.

Source: CricketArchive

See also
 2000–01 Red Stripe Bowl

References

2000 in West Indian cricket
West Indian cricket seasons from 2000–01
Regional Super50 seasons
Domestic cricket competitions in 2000–01